Szaffi (USA titled The Treasure of Swamp Castle) is a 1985 Hungarian-Canadian animated film directed by Attila Dargay. It is based on the 1885 book The Gypsy Baron by Mór Jókai, about the romance between a poor Hungarian aristocrat and a mysterious Romani-looking Turkish girl in the 18th century. Music from Johann Strauss II's operetta The Gypsy Baron, based on the same novel, is used for the film's soundtrack.

Cast

Hungarian dub
 András Kern as Jónás Botsinkay (son)
 Judit Pogány as Szaffi
 Hilda Gobbi as Cafrinka (“old witch”)
 György Bárdy as Feuerstein
 Gábor Maros as Puzzola
 Ferenc Zenthe as Gáspár Botsinkay (father)
 József Képessy as Ahmed
 Judit Hernádi as Arzéna
 László Csákányi as Loncsár
 János Gálvölgyi as Menyus, Gazsi bácsi and Strázsa
 Sándor Suka as Savoyai Eugén
 András Márton as Adjutáns
 Gellért Raksányi as Strázsamester
 Zoltán Gera as Asil
 Judit Czigány as Puzzola anyja

English dub
 Adrian Knight as Jonathan
 Steven Bednarski as Young Jonathan
 Michelle Turmel as Sabrina
 Bronwen Mantel as Esmeralda
 Vlasta Vrána as Governor
 Arthur Grosser as Ollie
 Christopher Plummer as Sheik Ali Suleiman
 Walter Massey as Ahmed the Fearless
 Jane Woods as Petunia Piglet
 Rick Jones as General Tubthumper
 Arthur Holden as Captain
 Jennifer Seguin as Ollie's Mother

References

External links
 
 

1985 films
1985 animated films
1980s Hungarian-language films
Hungarian animated films
Hungarian children's films
Films directed by Attila Dargay
Fictional representations of Romani people
Films set in the 18th century
Films based on operettas
Animated musical films
1980s children's animated films
Animated films based on literature